Piestewa can refer to:

 Lori Piestewa, a Native American woman killed in the 2003 invasion of Iraq
 Piestewa Peak, the second highest point in the Phoenix Mountains
 Piestewa Freeway, a nickname for Arizona Route 51 in Metropolitan Phoenix